Edward Blackmon Jr. (born July 21, 1947) is an American attorney and politician. He is a member of the Mississippi House of Representatives from the 57th District, serving continuously since 1983, and is a member of the Democratic Party. He previously served a term from 1979 to 1980. Edward Blackmon Jr has served as Chairman of the Legislative Black Caucus, President of the Magnolia Bar Association, and is presently an emeritus trustee of Tougaloo College’s Board of Trustees. Edward Blackmon Jr was named by the National Law Journal as one of the Nation’s Top 10 Litigators in 2002 and 2013. Among Edward Blackmon’s many achievements in his role as a public servant, he is most proud of his work as a State Legislator in redistricting the State’s Legislative districts and judicial districts to increase the number of minority representatives in each of those offices. Edward  Blackmon has extensive experience in criminal law defense. During a 20 year period involving more than 50 defense trials, Edward Blackmon did not lose a single case.

Admitted in
United States Supreme Court
Fifth Circuit Court of Appeals
United States District Court, Northern District of Mississippi
United States District Court, Southern District of Mississippi
Supreme Court of Mississippi

Honors and awards
Lawyers Weekly USA 1999 Top Ten verdicts ($144,000,000.00)
National Law Journal 2002 11th winningest verdict ($171,270,000.00)
National Law Journal 2013 top 100 verdicts ($52,080,450.00)
Named as one of the Nation's Top Ten Litigators by the National Law Journal 2002
Named to Memphis Magazine Top Attorney in the Mid-South, 2014
National Academy of Personal Injury Attorneys 2014 Top 10 Attorney Award
Served as President of the Magnolia Bar Association
The George Washington University Black Law Alumni Association Distinguished Alumnus Award
The NAACP State Conference Medgar Evers Medallion Award
The Magnolia Bar Association R. Jess Brown Award
Tougaloo College Hall of Fame

References

1947 births
Living people
Democratic Party members of the Mississippi House of Representatives
African-American state legislators in Mississippi
21st-century American politicians
George Washington University alumni